Joseph Edmond Brodeur (July 5, 1898 in St. Hyacinthe, Quebec – May 19, 1988) was a politician in Manitoba, Canada.  He served in the Legislative Assembly of Manitoba as a Liberal-Progressive from 1952 to 1958.

Brodeur was educated at St. Boniface College.  He was a member of the Knights of Columbus, reaching the fourth degree by the mid-1950s. He was secretary-treasurer for the Rural Municipality of Ritchot. Brodeur ran an insurance agency and also operated a garage in partnership with his brother.

He was first elected to the Manitoba legislature in a by-election held on January 21, 1952, in the rural constituency of La Verendrye.  He was re-elected without difficulty in the 1953 provincial election, and was a backbench supporter of Douglas Campbell's government during his time in the legislature.  He did not seek re-election in 1958.

Brodeur died in Winnipeg and was buried in St. Adolphe.

References 

Manitoba Liberal Party MLAs
1898 births
1988 deaths
Franco-Manitoban people